Cadavéu is a parroquia (parish) in Valdés, a municipality within the province and autonomous community of Asturias, in northern Spain.

On September 5, 2022, the jury of the Princess of Asturias Awards granted Cadavéu the Exemplary Town of Asturias Award.

See also 
 Exemplary Town of Asturias Award

References 

Parishes in Valdés